Andrea Paola Krum (born June 21, 1970) better known as Paola Krum is an actress, singer, and dancer.

Biography
Andrea Paola Krum was born on June 21, 1970 in Palermo, Buenos Aires. She is the  only daughter of Raúl Krum and Teresita O’Donnell. She has three younger brothers.

She began studying classical dance as a child with Wasil Tupin and Merces Serrano, but an injury in her leg at age 15 changed all her ambitions.

Career

Her breakthrough came in the field of musical comedy. Work in television – in shows such as Sólo Para Pareja, Inconquistable Corazón,  Por siempre mujercitas, and El Arcángel. In 1996, she starred in the theatrical production of  Flores de Acero. Later, she played the protagonist in the weekly TV show, El Rafa, and in the telenovela,  Alas, Poder Y Pasión. Her film debut came in 1999 in Río Escondido, directed by Mercedes García Guevara. That same year she had a major role in Muñeca Brava, an Argentine telenovela and starring in the film La venganza. She was part of the cast of the play, Puck, Sueño de Una Noche de Veran. In 2000, she returned to musical comedy, playing Eliza Doolittle in Mi Bella Dama (My Fair Lady). She last appeared on-stage in Monólogos de La Vagina (The Vagina Monologues). Back on TV in 2001, she starred in the series Cuatro Amigas. In 2003, Paola traveled to Spain to film the made for TV movie, La Vida Aquí. Her played psychologist Dr. Laura Santini in the 2004 HBO mini-series Epitafios (shown in the United States in 2005). In 2006 she appeared in Montecristo, which aired on Telefe.

Filmography

Television

Theater

Movies

Awards and nominations

References

External links
 
 

1970 births
Living people
People from Buenos Aires
Argentine actresses
Argentine people of German-Jewish descent